The Women's individual competition at the Biathlon World Championships 2020 was held on 18 February 2020.

Results
The race was started at 14:15.

References

Women's individual